Douglas Taylor may refer to:

 Douglas D. Taylor, entrepreneur and academic researcher in the field of extracellular vesicles
 Douglas Graham Taylor (1936–2009), educator, farmer and political figure in Saskatchewan